Fairview Township is a township in Jones County, Iowa.

History
Fairview Township was organized in 1842.

References

Populated places in Jones County, Iowa
Townships in Iowa